Inge Jonas Mikael Sandberg (born March 29, 1969, in Kungsbacka, Sweden) is a retired Swedish ice hockey goaltender. He is currently working as a goaltending coach and assistant general manager of Tingsryds AIF of the HockeyAllsvenskan.

Sandberg played in the Elitserien for Västra Frölunda HC and Linköpings HC.

References

1969 births
Living people
Frölunda HC players
Linköping HC players
Swedish ice hockey goaltenders
EC VSV players
People from Kungsbacka
Sportspeople from Halland County